The Crystal Palace F.C. season 2009–10 was Crystal Palace's 5th consecutive season in the Championship, after a 15th-placed finish in the previous campaign. The season started well before taking a turn for the worse when the club was placed into administration at the end of January 2010, culminating in manager Neil Warnock leaving his job just over a month later and being replaced by Paul Hart, whose tenure saw the club survive relegation on the final day of the season.

Statistics
Last updated on 2 May 2010.

|}

Club

Management

League table

Matches

Preseason

Football League Championship

Football League Cup

FA Cup

End-of-season awards

Notes

References

External links
 Crystal Palace F.C. official website
 Crystal Palace F.C. on Soccerbase 
 

Crystal Palace F.C. seasons
Crystal Palace